Mount Isherwood is a flattish, mainly ice-covered mountain with steep rock slopes, located  west-southwest of Mount Strange in the Kohler Range of Marie Byrd Land, Antarctica. The mountain was first photographed from aircraft of U.S. Navy Operation Highjump in January 1947, and was named by the Advisory Committee on Antarctic Names for William F. Isherwood, a geophysicist on the United States Antarctic Research Program South Pole—Queen Maud Land Traverse II, 1965–66, and on the Marie Byrd Land Survey 1966–67.

References

Mountains of Marie Byrd Land